WPSM (91.1 FM) is a radio station broadcasting a Worship music format. Licensed to Fort Walton Beach, Florida, United States, the station serves Fort Walton Beach and most of northwest Florida. The station also streams online at destinyradio.live.

The station is owned by Destiny Worship Center Inc., and features programming from Salem Communications.

On October 9, 2020, WPSM changed its format from contemporary Christian to contemporary worship music, branded as "Destiny Radio".

Previous logo

References

External links

PSM
Contemporary worship music